The 2001 Frankfurt Galaxy season was the ninth season for the franchise in the NFL Europe League (NFLEL). The team was led by head coach Doug Graber in his first year, and played its home games at Waldstadion in Frankfurt, Germany. They finished the regular season in sixth place with a record of three wins and seven losses.

Offseason

Free agent draft

Personnel

Staff

Roster

Schedule

Standings

Game summaries

Week 1: at Scottish Claymores

Notes

References

Frankfurt
Frankfurt Galaxy seasons